The Children's Internet Protection Act (CIPA) is one of a number of bills that the United States Congress proposed to limit children's exposure to pornography and explicit content online.

Background

Both of Congress's earlier attempts at restricting indecent Internet content, the Communications Decency Act and the Child Online Protection Act, were held to be unconstitutional by the U.S. Supreme Court on First Amendment grounds.

CIPA represented a change in strategy by Congress. While the federal government had no means of directly controlling local school and library boards, many schools and libraries took advantage of Universal Service Fund (USF) discounts derived from universal service fees paid by users in order to purchase eligible telecom services and Internet access. In passing CIPA, Congress required libraries and K-12 schools using these E-Rate discounts on Internet access and internal connections to purchase and use a "technology protection measure" on every computer connected to the Internet. These conditions also applied to a small subset of grants authorized through the Library Services and Technology Act (LSTA). CIPA did not provide additional funds for the purchase of the "technology protection measure".

Stipulations

CIPA requires K-12 schools and libraries using E-Rate discounts to operate "a technology protection measure with respect to any of its computers with Internet access that protects against access through such computers to visual depictions that are obscene, child pornography, or harmful to minors". Such a technology protection measure must be employed "during any use of such computers by minors". The law also provides that the school or library "may disable the technology protection measure concerned, during use by an adult, to enable access for bona fide research or other lawful purpose". Schools and libraries that do not receive E-Rate discounts or only receive discounts for telecommunication services and not for Internet access or internal connections, do not have an obligation to filter under CIPA. As of 2007, approximately one-third of libraries had chosen to forego federal E-Rate and certain types of LSTA funds so they would not be required to institute filtering.

This act has several requirements for institutions to meet before they can receive government funds. Libraries and schools must "provide reasonable public notice and hold at least one public hearing or meeting to address the proposed Internet safety policy" as added by CIPA sec. 1732).

The policy proposed at this meeting must address:
 Measures to restrict a minor's access to inappropriate or harmful materials on the Internet
 Security and safety of minors using chat rooms, email, instant messaging, or any other types of online communications
 Unauthorized disclosure of a minor's personal information
 Unauthorized access like hacking by minors
CIPA requires schools monitor minors' Internet use, but does not require tracking by libraries. All Internet access, even by adults, must be filtered, though filtering requirements can be less restrictive for adults (filtering obscene and pornographic material but not other "harmful to minors" materials).

Content to be filtered 
The following content must be filtered or blocked:
 Obscenity as defined by Miller v. California (1973)
 Child pornography as defined by 18 U.S.C. 2256
 Harmful to minors

Some of the terms mentioned in this act, such as "inappropriate matter" and what is "harmful to minors", are explained in the law. Under the Neighborhood Act ( as added by CIPA sec. 1732), the definition of "inappropriate matter" is locally determined:

The CIPA defines "harmful to minors" as:

As mentioned above, there is an exception for "bona fide research". An institution can disable filters for adults in the pursuit of bona fide research or another type of lawful purpose. However, the law provides no definition for "bona fide research". However, in a later ruling the U.S. Supreme Court said that libraries would be required to adopt an Internet use policy providing for unblocking the Internet for adult users, without a requirement that the library inquire into the user's reasons for disabling the filter. Justice Rehnquist stated "[a]ssuming that such erroneous blocking presents constitutional difficulties, any such concerns are dispelled by the ease with which patrons may have the filtering software disabled. When a patron encounters a blocked site, he need only ask a librarian to unblock it or (at least in the case of adults) disable the filter". This effectively puts the decision of what constitutes "bona fide research" in the hands of the adult asking to have the filter disabled. The U.S. Federal Communications Commission (FCC) subsequently instructed libraries complying with CIPA to implement a procedure for unblocking the filter upon request by an adult.

Suit challenging CIPA's constitutionality

On January 17, 2001, the American Library Association (ALA) voted to challenge CIPA, on the grounds that the law required libraries to unconstitutionally block access to constitutionally protected information on the Internet. It charged first that, because CIPA's enforcement mechanism involved removing federal funds intended to assist disadvantaged facilities, "CIPA runs counter to these federal efforts to close the digital divide for all Americans". Second, it argued that "no filtering software successfully differentiates constitutionally protected speech from illegal speech on the Internet".

Working with the American Civil Liberties Union (ACLU), the ALA successfully challenged the law before a three-judge panel of the U.S. District Court for the Eastern District of Pennsylvania. In a 200-page decision, the judges wrote that "in view of the severe limitations of filtering technology and the existence of these less restrictive alternatives [including making filtering software optional or supervising users directly], we conclude that it is not possible for a public library to comply with CIPA without blocking a very substantial amount of constitutionally protected speech, in violation of the First Amendment". 201 F.Supp.2d 401, 490 (2002).

Upon appeal to the U.S. Supreme Court, however, the law was upheld as constitutional as a condition imposed on institutions in exchange for government funding. In upholding the law, the Supreme Court, adopting the interpretation urged by the U.S. Solicitor General at oral argument, made it clear that the constitutionality of CIPA would be upheld only "if, as the Government represents, a librarian will unblock filtered material or disable the Internet software filter without significant delay on an adult user's request".

In the ruling Chief Justice William Rehnquist, joined by Justice Sandra Day O'Connor, Justice Antonin Scalia, and Justice Clarence Thomas, concluded two points. First, "Because public libraries' use of Internet filtering software does not violate their patrons' First Amendment rights, CIPA does not induce libraries to violate the Constitution, and is a valid exercise of Congress' spending power". The argument goes that, because of the immense amount of information available online and how quickly it changes, libraries cannot separate items individually to exclude, and blocking entire websites can often lead to an exclusion of valuable information. Therefore, it is reasonable for public libraries to restrict access to certain categories of content. Secondly, "CIPA does not impose an unconstitutional condition on libraries that receive E-Rate and LSTA subsidies by requiring them, as a condition on that receipt, to surrender their First Amendment right to provide the public with access to constitutionally protected speech". The argument here is that, the government can offer public funds to help institutions fulfill their roles, as in the case of libraries providing access to information. The Justices cited Rust v. Sullivan (1991) as precedent to show how the Court has approved using government funds with certain limitations to facilitate a program. Furthermore, since public libraries traditionally do not include pornographic material in their book collections, the court can reasonably uphold a law that imposes a similar limitation for online texts.

As noted above, the text of the law authorized institutions to disable the filter on request "for bona fide research or other lawful purpose", implying that the adult would be expected to provide justification with his request. But under the interpretation urged by the Solicitor General and adopted by the Supreme Court, libraries would be required to adopt an Internet use policy providing for unblocking the Internet for adult users, without a requirement that the library inquire into the user's reasons for disabling the filter.

Legislation after CIPA

An attempt to expand CIPA to include "social networking" web sites was considered by the U.S. Congress in 2006. See Deleting Online Predators Act. More attempts have been made recently by the International Society for Technology in Education (ISTE) and the Consortium for School Networking (CoSN) urging Congress to update CIPA terms in hopes of regulating, not abolishing, students' access to social networking and chat rooms. Neither ISTE nor CoSN wish to ban these online communication outlets entirely however, as they believe the "Internet contains valuable content, collaboration and communication opportunities that can and do materially contribute to a student's academic growth and preparation for the workforce".

See also 

 Content-control software
 Internet censorship
 The King's English v. Shurtleff
 State of Connecticut v. Julie Amero
 Think of the children

References

External links
 Text of the Children's Internet Protection Act

Legal history
ALA's CIPA litigation history page.
ALA v. US, Opinion of the US District Court for the Eastern District of Pennsylvania, May 31, 2002
US v. ALA, Opinion of the US Supreme Court, June 23, 2003

FCC information and regulations
FCC Order 03-188 dated July 23, 2003, adopting measures to ensure that the FCC's implementation of the Children’s Internet Protection Act (CIPA) complies with the recent decision of the United States Supreme Court.
FCC Consumer Facts: CIPA.
Universal Service Administrative Co. CIPA page.

United States federal computing legislation
Internet censorship in the United States
Child safety
Content-control software
Federal Communications Commission